I Want to See the Light/Coboloid Race is the debut single by Rational Youth, released as a double A-side 12" single in October 1981.

The two main tracks were re-released as bonus tracks on the 1997 CD of Cold War Night Life, and as a CD single in 2000, as part of the Early Singles box set. All CD releases use Tracy Howe's 1997 edit of "I Want to See the Light", which cuts some repetitive parts. (The instrumental version "Light Instrumental" has never been re-issued.)

"Coboloid Race" was remixed by Bill Vorn in 1998 for the 3 Remixes For The New Cold War EP.

Track listing
"I Want to See the Light" (Tracy Howe) - 4:23
"Coboloid Race" (Bill Vorn) - 5:21
"Light instrumental" (Howe) - 4:23

Personnel
 Tracy Howe - vocals, synthesizers
 Bill Vorn - synthesizers, programming
 Mario Spezza - synthesizers

Rational Youth albums